Vital Valadzyankow (born 25 April 1976) is a retired Belarusian professional footballer.

Career
Born in Minsk, Valadzyankow began playing football in FC Dinamo Minsk's youth system. He joined the senior team and made his Belarusian Premier League debut in 1995.

Honours
Dinamo Minsk
 Belarusian Premier League champion: 1994–95, 1995, 1997, 2004
 Belarusian Cup winner: 2002–03

Naftan Novopolotsk
 Belarusian Cup winner: 2008–09

References

External links
 

1976 births
Living people
Belarusian footballers
Belarus international footballers
Belarusian Premier League players
FC Dinamo-Juni Minsk players
FC Dinamo Minsk players
Russian Premier League players
FC Naftan Novopolotsk players
FC Sokol Saratov players
FC Darida Minsk Raion players
FC Neman Grodno players
FC Gorodeya players
Belarusian expatriate footballers
Expatriate footballers in Russia
Association football midfielders